The men's pole vault event at the 1998 Commonwealth Games was held on 20 September in Kuala Lumpur.

New Zealand's Denis Petushinskiy originally won the silver with 5.55 metres, which would have been the new national record, but he tested positive for a banned substance, stanozolol. He was disqualified and his result annulled.

Results

References

Pole
1998